Football Survey is an Australian television series which aired in 1957. Broadcast at 7:50PM on Mondays on Melbourne station GTV-9, it was a series in which Australian rules football personalities discussed the weekend matches, and aired in a 10-minute time-slot. It was sponsored by Brylcreem, and was originally hosted by Ian Johnson, later by Sam Loxton.

The series aired against U.S. series Disneyland on HSV-7 and US series Sherlock Holmes on ABV-2.

See also

List of Australian television series

References

External links

1957 Australian television series debuts
1957 Australian television series endings
Australian sports television series
English-language television shows
Black-and-white Australian television shows